was a Japanese daimyō of the Azuchi–Momoyama and Edo periods. His court title was Higo-no-kami. His name as a child was Yashamaru, and first name was Toranosuke. He was one of Hideyoshi's Seven Spears of Shizugatake.

Biography

Kiyomasa was born in what is now Nakamura-ku, Nagoya (situated in contemporary Aichi District, Owari Province) to Katō Kiyotada. Kiyotada's wife, Ito, was a cousin of Toyotomi Hideyoshi's mother. Kiyotada died while his son, Kiyomasa (then known as Toranosuke), was still young. Soon after, Toranosuke entered into Hideyoshi's service, and in 1576, at age 15, was granted a stipend of 170 koku.

In 1582, he fought in Hideyoshi's army at the Battle of Yamazaki, and later in 1583 at the Battle of Shizugatake. Owing to his achievement in that battle, he became known as one of the Seven Spears of Shizugatake and was rewarded with 3,000 additional koku.

In 1584, Kiyomasa took part in the Battle of Komaki and Nagakute against the Tokugawa clan.

When Hideyoshi became the kampaku in the summer of 1585, Kiyomasa received the court title of Kazue no Kami (主計頭, head of the accounting bureau) and junior 5th court rank, lower grade (ju go-i no ge 従五位下). In 1587, he fought in the Kyūshū campaign against the Shimazu clan. Later, after Higo Province was confiscated from Sassa Narimasa, he was granted 250,000 koku of land in Higo (roughly half of the province), and given Kumamoto Castle as his provincial residence.

Korean campaign

Kiyomasa was one of the three senior commanders during the Seven-Year (Imjin) War (1592–1598) against the Korean Joseon. Together with Konishi Yukinaga, he captured Seoul, Busan and many other cities. He defeated the last of the Korean regulars at the Battle of Imjin River and pacified Hamgyong.

The Korean king Seonjo abandoned Seoul before Kiyomasa's forces. Kiyomasa held two Korean princes who had deserted as hostages and used them to force lower-ranking Korean officials to surrender. During the war, he apparently hunted tigers for sport, using a yari (spear), and later presented the pelts to Hideyoshi. Some versions of the story say he was in fact hunting tigers to catch them alive, in order to bring their meat to Hideyoshi, as he thought it would improve his lord's health, but later, the tigers were killed because of the lack of food for his men.

Kiyomasa was a renowned castle-builder. During the Imjin war he built several strategic Japanese-style castles in the territories he conquered. Ulsan castle was one of such fortresses and the site of Kiyomasa's most famous battle — the Siege of Ulsan on December 22, 1597. Kiyomasa led the defense of the castle, successfully holding at bay Chinese general Yang Hao's army, which numbered 60,000. He defended the castle until November 23, 1598. However, his bravery was not reported to Hideyoshi by his rival and superior Ishida Mitsunari. Hideyoshi recalled him to Kyōto.

As did a number of other daimyōs who participated in the invasion of Korea, he took a group of captive Korean potters back to his fief in Kyūshū.

Sekigahara campaign
After Hideyoshi's death, Kiyomasa clashed with Ishida Mitsunari, and started approaching Tokugawa Ieyasu. both Tokugawa Ieyasu and Ishida Mitsunari courted his support. Ishida's so-called Western forces might well have gotten themselves a formidable warrior were it not for two factors that decided Kiyomasa, otherwise a Toyotomi loyalist. First, the Western forces were led by Ishida Mitsunari, whom Katô loathed as a civilian interloper and had quarreled with during the Korean campaign; and second, the Western forces included Konishi Yukinaga. Although Konishi's navy had aided Kiyomasa quite a bit at the Siege of Ulsan, the two men despised each other as much as ever.

Katô joined with Tokugawa and during the Sekigahara campaign (August–October 1600) fought Ishida's allies on Kyushu and took a number of Konishi's castles. He was preparing to invade the Shimazu domain when the campaign ended and Ieyasu ordered him to stand down. For his service, Katô was awarded the other half of Higo (formerly owned by Konishi, who was executed in the wake of Sekigahara), bringing his income to nearly 500,000 koku.

Death
In his later years, Kiyomasa tried to work as a mediator for the increasingly complicated relationship between Ieyasu and Toyotomi Hideyori. In 1611, en route by sea to Kumamoto after one such meeting, he fell ill, and died shortly after his arrival. He was buried at Honmyō-ji temple in Kumamoto, but also has graves in Yamagata Prefecture and Tokyo. Kiyomasa is also enshrined in many Shinto shrines in Japan, including Katō Shrine in Kumamoto.

His son, Katō Tadahiro, succeeded him as Higo no kami 肥後守 (provincial governor of Higo), but his fief (Kumamoto) was confiscated, and he was exiled (kaieki; attaindered) in 1632 by Tokugawa Iemitsu on suspicion of conspiring against him, possibly with the likes of Tokugawa Tadanaga, who was ordered to commit seppuku in 1633.

Personality

A devoted believer of Nichiren Buddhism, Kiyomasa encouraged the building of Nichiren temples across his domains.  He came into conflict with Konishi Yukinaga, who ruled the other half of Higo province, and was a Christian, Kiyomasa being noted for brutally suppressing and persecuting Christianity. At the battle of Hondo, he ordered his men to cut open the bellies of all pregnant Christian women and cut off their infants' heads.

William Scott Wilson describes Katō Kiyomasa thus: "He was a military man first and last, outlawing even the recitation of poetry, putting the martial arts above all else. His precepts show the single-mindedness and Spartan attitudes of the man, [they] demonstrate emphatically that the warrior's first duty in the early 17th century was simply to 'grasp the sword and die'. Contemporary accounts of Katō describe him as awe-inspiring, yet not unfriendly, and a natural leader of men."

Family
Kiyomasa married a daughter of Mizuno Tadashige, Shōjō-in, who was adopted by Tokugawa Ieyasu prior to their marriage. Their daughter, Yōrin-in, would go on to marry Tokugawa Ieyasu's 10th son, Tokugawa Yorinobu.

Honour
In 1910, Kiyomasa was posthumously promoted to junior 3rd court rank (jusanmi 従三位).

In popular culture
Katō Kiyomasa is a character in the Koei video games Kessen, Kessen III, Samurai Warriors 3, Samurai Warriors 4, Mōri Motonari: Chikai no Sanshi and Age of Empires III. He is a playable character in Pokémon Conquest (Pokémon + Nobunaga's Ambition in Japan), with his partner Pokémon being Fraxure and Haxorus.

See also
Katō Yoshiaki
Battle of Sendaigawa

References

Further reading
Kitajima Manji 北島万次 (2007). Katō Kiyomasa Chōsen shinryaku no jitsuzō 加藤清正: 朝鮮侵略の実像. Tokyo: Yoshikawa Kōbunkan 吉川弘文館.

Honours
 Junior Third Rank

External links

Kato Kiyomasa's wiki bio at Samurai Archives

1562 births
1611 deaths
16th-century Japanese people
17th-century Japanese people
Daimyo
People of the Japanese invasions of Korea (1592–1598)
Samurai
Toyotomi retainers
Japanese Buddhists
Nichiren Buddhists
16th-century Buddhists
17th-century Buddhists
Bushido
Deified Japanese people
People from Nagoya